Federico Díaz is an artist of Czech-Argentinean descent, who lives and works in Prague. He has exhibited at the Mori Art Museum Tokyo,  CAFA Museum Beijing, Institute of Contemporary Arts London, Center for Art and Media Karlsruhe, Ars Electronica Linz, Massachusetts Museum of Contemporary Art, Art Basel in Miami Beach (in collaboration with MoMA PS1), the Florence Biennale, at the 54thVenice Biennale, the Brno House of Arts, Royal Institute of British Architects and had a project with the University of Cambridge. In 2010 he represented Czech art at the World Expo 2010 in Shanghai. In 2007 he received the Premio Internazionale Lorenzo il Magnifico for digital media at the Florence Biennale.

Díaz seeks to use media and technologies as a catalyst of socio-political change. His latest project BOAR  presents the site-specific robotic performance robot by Federico and novelist and technologist J.M.Ledgard. SPOT, a robot developed by Boston Dynamic, imitates a wild boar through artificial intelligence (AI).

His long-term project, "Big Light," follows an ongoing series of presentations pressing topics of relationship between nature, humankind, and the vision of conscious machines equipped with a highly developed AI.

From 2007 to 2014 Díaz was the head of the Supermedia Studio at Academy of Arts, Architecture and Design in Prague.

Education and artistic career
Díaz graduated from the Academy of Fine Arts, Prague (1990–1997). In 1993 he received a scholarship to Alexander Dorner Kreis. He has also completed a research fellowship at the Cité internationale des arts in Paris and at the Soros Center for Contemporary Art (SCCA-Ljubljana).

Díaz was a lecturer at Masaryk University in Brno, where he took part in creating the Digital Media specialization at the Faculty of Social Studies. In Prague, he was the Head of the Supermedia Studio at the Academy of Arts, Architecture and Design (AAAD), which he founded together with Rafani art group member David Kořínek. He has also lectured at Columbia University in New York City, Storefront for Art and Architecture, University at Buffalo and Gramazio & Kohler Architecture and Digital Fabrication, ETH Zürich.

Díaz received a special award from the Nicola Trussardi Foundation for his work Generatrix at Milano Europe Futuro Presente in 2001. In 2007 he received the Premio Internazionale “Lorenzo il Magnifico” award at the Florence Biennale for his project Sakura.

From 1996 until 2002 he was a finalist for the Jindřich Chalupecký Award, which is granted to Czech artists under 35 years of age.

Since the early 1990s, Díaz has exhibited at festivals and new media group exhibitions in Europe and Japan. His first solo exhibition was at City Gallery Prague in 1997, and since that time his solo exhibitions in the Czech Republic have been held at the Moravian Gallery in Brno, Mánes Exhibition Hall, Prague Castle Riding School, the National Gallery in Prague, and the Brno House of Arts.

He has also exhibited at numerous international exhibitions and prominent institutions, including the Institute of Contemporary Art and Royal Institute of British Architects in London, ZKM Center for Art and Media Karlsruhe (2004), Fondation Electricité de France in Paris (2003), Ars Electronica Festival in Linz (2005) and Mori Art Museum in Tokyo (2005). Important recent projects have included MASS MoCA in North Adams, Massachusetts (2010), the 54th Venice Biennial (2011), a project in collaboration with the University of Cambridge (2017). SLS object from his Resonance project is a part of permanent collection at the FRAC Centre in Orleans, France.

Work
Díaz is associated with a pro-science orientation in contemporary art. In his work, science and art are two equal, integral parts. Philosopher Miroslav Petřiček, who has worked with Díaz since 2008, says “Art is an analogue of science, but we just don’t know which serves as a model for the other.” For Díaz, science is important as a framework of understanding.

Díaz’s work is formed together with sources of inspiration from throughout 20th-century art. His approach to art and the concept that the world is a field of diverse energetic vibrations have been essential to Díaz’s development in contemporary art.

Alanna Heiss, the founder and till recently the Director of MoMA PS1 in New York, requested that Díaz’s installation Ultra represent MoMA PS1 at Miami Art Basel. She explains, “Diaz’s installation, ULTRA, is in many ways a visualization of metaphysical space. With roots in Eastern Europe and South America, Díaz’s interest in futurism and modernism stems from two continents. His practice encompasses the Utopian attitudes of the 1960s as well as the advanced materials of this century.”

Thomas M. Messer, director emeritus of the Solomon R. Guggenheim Museum, says the following about Diaz’s work: “The work of Federico Diaz may be seen in terms parallel to music, which is made up of tonalities and of rhythms. In the visual arts, these elements correspond to colors and forms. Díaz’s static and kinetic elements thus combine to yield a high degree of expressiveness, which, again as in the case of music, remains without representational intent.”

Díaz speaks about the power of man, opportunities for better education and understanding among societies and people.

Robotics
In 1999, Federico Díaz started an autonomous anthropomorphic augmented structure “Mnemeg” which was responsive to visitors in the gallery space. This was one of his first experiments with smart algorithms and laid the grounds for his others works of the first decade of the new millennium, namely the works "Geometric Death Frequency-141" for MASS MoCA (2010) and "Outside Itself" for the Venice Biennale (2011).

Díaz presented results of these projects and their possible implications at the conference Digital Handwerk at the Architekforum Zurich organised by ETH and the studio of Gramazio & Kohler and later on conference RobArch in Vienna. 

Díaz's project LacrimAu at EXPO 2010 in Shanghai took the form of a glass cubicle containing a golden teardrop, with room for a single visitor. The exhibit would read the visitor's brain waves and produce a customized scent in response.

In 2013 Díaz started to experiment with printing mechanisms as tools for algorithmic paintings based on the pattern of movement of audience in the exhibition space. This technique was presented at the CAFA Museum in Beijing in the project "You Welded the Ornament of the Times" (2014).

A shift in Díaz’ perception of technology came with the project "Eccentric Gravity" (2015) curated by Jérôme Sans and Jen Kratochvil, a site-specific architectural intervention in the historical Renaissance Royal Belvedere Pavilion.

Díaz’s long term project Big Light has been presented at the Brno House of Arts (2016) and in collaboration with University of Cambridge (2017).

Selected works and projects
BOAR (2022) part of the 12th Berlin Biennale for Contemporary Art. Commissioned by LAS.
Aerial (Na Horu) (2018-2022) a monumental public sculpture in Prague, Czech Republic.
Eccentric Gravity: Heraldic (2015-2020)
Big Light I'm Leaving the Body (2019)
Subtile Sacramento (2017-2018)
Big Light Space of Augmented Suggestion (2017)
Big Light (2016), The Brno House of Arts handed over its historic International Style galleries to Díaz, to create an experimental laboratory and its information centre.
 Eccentric Gravity (2015), utilises the architectural features of Prague Castle's Belvedere Palace as the ground plan for a reflection on the building history.
 Outside Itself (2011), created specifically for the Arsenale at the Venice Biennial 2011 as part of ILLUMInations.
 You Welded the Ornament of the Times (2014), Walls in the CAFA Art Museum in Beijing acts as a canvases for recording the action; an automated plotter system layers traditional ink on the surface, creating a permanent record of this ephemeral activity. 
 Geometric Death Frequency-141 (2010), a site-specific installation for MASS MoCA in Massachusetts.
 LacrimAu (2010)
 Adhesion (2009)
 Ultra (2008)
 Resonance (2007)
 Efekt (2006)
 Fluid F1 (2006)
 Sakura (2004-2005)
 Sembion (2003-2004), created in cooperation with the Research Centre at the Academy of Fine Arts in Prague and Jiří Ševčík, a Czech art theorist. The project has been presented at Die Algorithmische Revolution at Center for Art and Media Karlsruhe, and Institute of Contemporary Arts London.

 Generatrix (1999-2002)
 Mnemeg (1999-2002)
 Empact (1998)
 Photon I, II (1996-1997)
 Spin (1994)
 Dehibernation I, II (1993-1994), exhibited at the Biennale of Young Art at City Gallery Prague in 1994 and at the Netz Europa exhibition in Linz, Austria.

References

External links

Official website

Academy of Fine Arts, Prague alumni
Academic staff of Masaryk University
Living people
Artists from Prague
1971 births
Academic staff of the Academy of Arts, Architecture and Design in Prague